You Make Me Feel: The Ballads is the fifth compilation by the German hard rock band Bonfire.  It is a greatest hits collection that was released by LZ Records in 2009, featuring a double CD set of all the best ballad songs by the band.  The album also features a new version of "You Make Me Feel" as well as "Domo Arigato" that was on the Japanese version of The Räuber.  Although at the time of this release Dominik Huelshorst was the band's drummer, it is the previous drummer, Jurgen Wiehler, that plays on the two songs previously mentioned.

Track listing

CD 1

CD 2

Band members
(At the time of this release)

Claus Lessmann - lead vocals
Hans Ziller - guitars
Chris Limburg - guitars
Uwe Köhler - bass
Dominik Huelshorst - drums

Bonfire (band) compilation albums
2009 compilation albums